Brandon Tellez (born 17 February 2005) is a Mexican-American soccer player who came through the academy at La Galaxy and made his USL Championship debut in late 2022 for LA Galaxy II.

Career
Tellez made his debut in the USL Championship for LA Galaxy II on October 12, 2022 against New Mexico United playing from the start, in Isotopes Park, Albuquerque. On October 26, 2022 he was named LA Galaxy academy player of the year.

Tellez was named by English newspaper The Guardian as one of the best players born in 2005 worldwide.

Style of play
Tellez has been said by soccer journalist Jon Arnold to possess the “mentality and physical skills needed to play as a defensive midfielder” but more than that, has developed into a forward-thinking player as well due to his “abilities to turn in tight spaces or pull a trick out of his bag to dribble past defenders”.

International career
In August  and September 2022, Tellez was called
up to train with the Mexico national under-18 football team. He made his debut on September 25, 2022 against Germany in a friendly match.

References

External links

2005 births
Living people
Sportspeople from Fullerton, California
Soccer players from California
American sportspeople of Mexican descent
American soccer players
Mexican footballers
Mexico youth international footballers
Association football midfielders
LA Galaxy players